Hans Priimägi (28 February 1880 Keeni Parish, Tartu County – ?) was an Estonian politician. He was a member of Estonian Constituent Assembly. He was a member of the assembly since 22 May 1919. He replaced Jaan Uri. On 26 August 1919, he resigned his position and he was replaced by Jaan Järve.

References

1880 births
Members of the Estonian Constituent Assembly
Year of death missing